Helicogermslita is a genus of fungi in the family Xylariaceae. Fossils have been found in rocks 12 million year old sediments from central England.

References

External links
Index Fungorum

Xylariales
Taxa named by David Leslie Hawksworth